Kulkison (Khülkhisöön) is a rural locality (a selo) in Kizhinginsky District, Republic of Buryatia, Russia. The population was 82 as of 2010. There is 1 street.

References 

Rural localities in Kizhinginsky District